Cycas candida is a species of cycad. It is an endangered species found only in Queensland.

References

candida
Endemic flora of Queensland
Plants described in 2004